Robert Charles Gill (January 17, 1931November 9, 2021) was an American illustrator and graphic designer.

Biography
Robert Charles Gill was born on January 17, 1931, in Brooklyn, New York.

Gill played the piano at summer resorts in the Catskill Mountains, New York, to pay his school tuition. He attended the Philadelphia Museum School of Art (1948–1951), Pennsylvania Academy of Fine Arts (1951), City College of New York (1952, 1955). When he graduated he became a professional graphic designer in New York City.

Gill acted as a film title designer in several films, including several films of Ray Harryhausen.

In 1960 after an interview in a New York hotel room for a job in London, he moved to the UK to work for Charles Hobson.

April Fool's Day, 1962, Gill, Alan Fletcher and Colin Forbes established Fletcher/Forbes/Gill design studio, the forerunner of Pentagram. F/F/G soon outgrew their small studio and moved into a huge Victorian former gun factory on a canal. They started the Designers and Art Directors Association D&AD and opened a second office in Geneva.

In 1967, Gill left the partnership and assumed independent freelancing again, including teaching, filmmaking and writing children’s books. He returned to New York in 1975 to write and design  Beatlemania, the largest  multimedia musical up to that time on Broadway, on which he worked with Robert Rabinowitz. He also proposed a peace monument for Times Square, Gill wanted to collect military junk from all over the world, pile it 40 feet high, spray it matte black, and mount it on a block of white marble. The New York City Fine Arts Commission did not like the idea.

For his graphic design work, Gill has won a number of awards, sold illustrations to Esquire, Architectural Forum, Fortune, Seventeen, and The Nation magazines and has illustrated children’s books and designed film titles. He has also designed for Apple Corps records, Rainbow Theatre, Pirelli, Nestlé, CBS, Universal Pictures, Joseph Losey, Queen (now Harpers & Queen), High Times magazines and the United Nations. He was elected to the New York Art Directors Club Hall of Fame in 1991 and the Designers and Art Directors Association of London has presented him with their Lifetime Achievement Award.

He lived in New York with his wife, New York Public Radio's Sara Fishko. They had a son, Jack Gill, and a daughter, Kate Gill. Gill died on November 9, 2021, in Brooklyn, aged 90.

Teaching posts
 1955–1960, School of Visual Arts (SVA), Manhattan
 1959, Pratt Institute, Brooklyn
 1967–1969, Central School of Art and Design, London
 1969, Chelsea School of Art (now Chelsea College of Art and Design), London
 1970–1975, Royal College of Art (RCA), London
 1972–1974, Hornsey School of Art, London
 1981–1983, Parsons School of Design (now Parsons The New School for Design), Manhattan
 1992–1994, School of Visual Arts (SVA), Manhattan
 2003–2011, Graduate Communications Department, Pratt Institute, Manhattan

Awards (partial)
 1955, Gold Medal, New York Art Directors Club, for a CBS television title, US
 1999, President's Award, D&AD (British Design & Art Direction), UK

Books written

 Bob Gill’s Portfolio, Amsterdam: Wim Crouwel / Stedelijk Museum, 1967
 Bob Gill’s Portfolio, London: Lund Humphries, 1968
 I Keep Changing, New York: Scroll Press, 1971. | )
 Bob Gill’s New York, London: Kynoch Press,  1971.
 Ups & Downs, Reading, Massachusetts: Addison-Wesley, 1974.
 Forget All the Rules You Ever Learned About Graphic Design, Including the Ones in this Book, New York: Watson-Guptill, 1981. | 
 Graphic Design Made Difficult, New York: Van Nostrand Reinhold, 1992. | 
 Unspecial Effects for Graphic Designers, New York: Graphis, 2001 | 
 Graphic Design as a Second Language, Victoria: Images Publishing Group, 2003 | 
 Illustration, Victoria: Images Publishing Group, 2004 | 
 LogoMania, Gloucester: Rockport Publishers, 2006 | 
 Words Into Pictures, Victoria: Images Publishing Group, 2009 | 
 Bob Gill, so far., London: Laurence King Publishing, 2011 |

References

 “Bob Gill” in Morgan, Ann (1984). Contemporary Designers, New York: Macmillan. | 
 Baglee, Patrick (1999). “Reputations: Bob Gill”, an interview, Eye magazine, vol. 33, no. 9,  Autumn.

External links
 
 

1931 births
2021 deaths
20th-century American artists
21st-century American artists
Academics of the Central School of Art and Design
Academics of the Royal College of Art
American graphic designers
American illustrators
Logo designers
Artists from Brooklyn